Guedj is an Algerian Jewish surname. Notable people with the surname include:

Arnaud Guedj
Denis Guedj (1940–2010), French novelist and professor
Jérôme Guedj (born 1972), French politician
Nadav Guedj (born 1998), French-Israeli singer and actor

Jewish surnames